Camila Hermeto Pedrosa-Freire (born March 12, 1975 in São Paulo) is a female water polo player from Brazil, who twice won a bronze medal with the Brazil women's national water polo team at the Pan American Games: 1999 and 2003. She also competed at the 2007 Pan American Games, finishing in fourth place.

At club level, Pedrosa played in Greece most notably for ANO Glyfada and Olympiacos. She won the 1999–00 LEN Champions Cup with Glyfada. In 2004–05 season, she played for Olympiacos in the Greek League and the LEN Trophy.

References

External links
 Profile  
 profile at cob.org.br  

1975 births
Living people
Brazilian female water polo players
Water polo players from São Paulo
Olympiacos Women's Water Polo Team players
Pan American Games bronze medalists for Brazil
Olympic water polo players of Brazil
Water polo players at the 2016 Summer Olympics
Pan American Games medalists in water polo
Water polo players at the 1999 Pan American Games
Water polo players at the 2003 Pan American Games
Medalists at the 1999 Pan American Games
Medalists at the 2003 Pan American Games
21st-century Brazilian women